Holy Trinity Cathedral is an Eastern Orthodox cathedral in Riga, the capital of Latvia. The cathedral is situated at the address 126 Krišjānis Barons Street.

References

External links 
 

Churches in Riga
Cathedrals in Latvia